Parsbanaj (also Romanized as Parsbānaj and Parsbānej; also known as Parīs Banīch, Parastanaj, Parīs Bīnaj, and Parnespānej) is a village in Shahidabad Rural District, Central District, Avaj County, Qazvin Province, Iran. At the 2006 census, its population was 1,228, in 261 families.

References 

Populated places in Avaj County